L'Écho taurin was a publication from Béziers, France which called for support to 'bull-fighting and southern freedoms'. It was founded as a weekly newspaper in 1882. In 1932 it became a seasonal publication. In the 1930s, its director was J. Rodriguez.

References

1882 establishments in France
Bullfighting
Mass media in Béziers
Publications established in 1882
Defunct newspapers published in France